NGC 8 is an asterism of two completely unrelated stars (spectral types K6I and G4) in the constellation Pegasus, discovered on 29 September 1865 by Otto Wilhelm von Struve. It is approximately 2.7 arc minutes away from NGC 9.

The two stars are completely unrelated to each other, with the whiter, dimmer star (2MASS J00084563+2350186) being at a distance of  light years, and the yellower, brighter star (2MASS J00084521+2350184) having a minimum distance of 215,000 light years. While both stars are technically outside the Milky Way's galactic disc, the nearer is  light-years south of the 1,000-light-year-thick disc, and the further is not only at least 130,000 light-years south of the disk, but is located entirely outside the Milky Way itself, being at least 220,000 light-years from the galactic core.

References

External links
 
 

Double stars
Pegasus (constellation)
0008
000648
J00084521+2350184
18650929
Discoveries by Otto Struve

de:Liste der NGC-Objekte von 1 bis 500#Nr. 1 bis 100